Arctic Tale is a video game for the Nintendo DS, Game Boy Advance and Wii. The game is about trying to survive as a polar bear (adult or young), a walrus, a killer whale, or an Arctic fox.  It is loosely based on the National Geographic documentary about Arctic wildlife also called Arctic Tale.

The game was released on December 3, 2007 in the USA.

Reception

Arctic Tale received mixed reviews for the Wii, but received negative reviews for Nintendo DS and GBA.

References

External links
 Puissance-Nintendo

2007 video games
Educational video games
Game Boy Advance games
National Geographic Society
Nintendo DS games
Polar bears in popular culture
Video games based on films
Wii games
Video games set in the Arctic
Destination Software games
Video games scored by Allister Brimble
Video games about bears
Video games about foxes
Video games developed in the United Kingdom
Video games with underwater settings
Atomic Planet Entertainment games